The 1991 NatWest Trophy was a limited-overs English county cricket tournament, held between 26 June and 7 September 1991.  The competition was won by Hampshire who beat Surrey by 4 wickets in the final at Lord's.

Format
The seventeen first-class counties, joined by 13 Minor Counties: Bedfordshire, Berkshire, Buckinghamshire, Cambridgeshire, Devon, Dorset, Durham, Hertfordshire, Lincolnshire, Norfolk, Oxfordshire, Shropshire and Staffordshire.  The Ireland national cricket team and the Scotland national cricket team also participated.  Teams who won in the first round progressed to the second round.  The winners in the second round then progressed to the quarter-final stages. Winners from the quarter-finals then progressed to the semi-finals from which the winners then went on to the final at Lord's which was held on 7 September 1991.

Fixtures

First round

Second round

Quarter-finals

Semi-finals

Final

External links 
Cricinfo tournament page
CricketArchive tournament page

References

Friends Provident Trophy seasons
Natwest Trophy, 1991
NatWest Group